Tiraspol (Moldovan Cyrillic: Тираспол,); occasionally also known in Romanian as Tirișpolea) is the de facto capital of Transnistria, a breakaway state of Moldova, where it is the third largest city. The city is located on the eastern bank of the Dniester River. Tiraspol is a regional hub of light industry, such as furniture and electrical goods production.

The modern city of Tiraspol was founded by the Russian generalissimo Alexander Suvorov in 1792, although the area had been inhabited for thousands of years by varying ethnic groups. The city celebrates its anniversary every year on 14 October.

Etymology 
The toponym consists of two ancient Greek words: Τύρας, Tyras, the Ancient name for the Dniester River, and polis, i.e., a city (state).

History

Classical history 
Of no great importance in early times, in the 2nd century BC it fell under the dominion of indigenous kings whose names appear on its coins. It was destroyed by the Thracian Getae about 50 BC.

In 56 AD, the Romans restored the city and made it part of the colonial province of Lower Moesia. A series of its coins exist that feature heads of Roman emperors from Domitian to Severus Alexander. Soon after the time of the latter, the city was destroyed again, this time by the invasion of the Goths. Its government was in the hands of five archons, a senate, a popular assembly and a registrar. The images on its coins from this period suggest a trade in wheat, wine and fish. The few inscriptions extant are mostly concerned with trade.

Such ancient archeological remains are scanty, as the city site was built over by the great medieval fortress of Monocastro or Akkerman. During the Middle Ages, the area around Tiraspol was a buffer zone between the Tatars and the Moldavians, and inhabited by both ethnic groups.

Russian foundation 

The Russian Empire conquered its way to the Dniester River, taking territory from the Ottoman Empire. In 1792 the Russian army built fortifications to guard the western border near a Moldavian village named Sucleia. Field Marshal Alexander Suvorov is considered the founder of modern Tiraspol; his statue is the city's most distinctive landmark. The city took its name from Tyras, the Greek name of the Dniester River on which it stands.

In 1828, the Russian government established a customs house in Tiraspol to try to suppress smuggling. The customs house was subordinated to the chief of the Odessa customs region. It began operations with 14 employees. They inspected shipments of bread, paper, oil, wine, sugar, fruits and other goods.

Soviet Tiraspol 

After the Russian Revolution, the Moldavian Autonomous Soviet Socialist Republic was created in Ukraine in 1924, with Balta as its capital. The republic had Romanian, Ukrainian and Russian as its official languages. Its capital was moved in 1929 to Tiraspol, which remained the capital of the Moldavian ASSR until 1940.

In 1940, following the secret provisions of the Molotov–Ribbentrop Pact, the USSR forced Romania to cede Bessarabia. It integrated Tiraspol, until then part of the Ukrainian SSR, into the newly formed Moldavian SSR. On 7 August 1941, following the Axis invasion of the Soviet Union, the city was taken over by Romanian troops. Later that month, on 19 August, the Tiraspol Agreement establishing the Transnistria Governorate was signed. During the occupation, Tiraspol was under Romanian administration. During that period almost all of its Jewish population died: they were slain in situ or deported to German Nazi death camps, where they were murdered.

In 1941, before the occupation, the newspaper Dnestrovskaya Pravda was founded by the Tiraspol City Council of popular deputies. This is the oldest periodical publication in the region. On 12 April 1944, the city was retaken by the Red Army and became again part of Moldavian SSR.

Post-independence 

On 27 January 1990, the citizens in Tiraspol passed a referendum declaring the city as an independent territory. The nearby city of Bendery also declared its independence from Moldova. As the Russian-speaking independence movement gained momentum, some local governments banded together to resist pressure from the Moldovan government for nationalization.

On 2 September 1990, Tiraspol was proclaimed the capital of the new Pridnestrovian Moldavian Soviet Socialist Republic. The new republic was not officially recognized by Soviet authorities; however, it received support from some important Soviet leaders, such as Anatoly Lukyanov. After the dissolution of the Soviet Union, the territory east of the Dniester River declared independence as the Pridnestrovian Moldavian Republic (PMR), with Tiraspol as its capital. It was not recognized by the international community.

On 1 July 2005, the Lucian Blaga Lyceum, a high school with Romanian as its language of instruction, was registered as a Transnistrian non-governmental establishment. The registration of six Romanian language schools has been the subject of negotiations with the government since 2000. The tension increased in the summer of 2004, when the Transnistrian authorities forcibly closed the schools that taught using the Latin script. According to the official PMR view, this is considered as Romanian. "Moldovan", written in the Cyrillic script, is one of the three official languages in the PMR; Romanian is not. Some economic measures and counter-measures were taken on both banks of the Dniester.

Tensions have been seen in terrorist incidents. On 6 July 2006, an explosion, believed to be caused by a bomb, killed at least eight people in a minibus. Later on 13 August, a grenade exploded in a trolleybus, killing two and injuring ten. The 2022 Tiraspol bombing happened on the 25 April 2022 during the 2022 Russian invasion of Ukraine when several explosions were reported near the Ministry of State Security (Transnistria) in Tiraspol. Firefighters were on the scene but there were no casualties.

Geography and climate
Tiraspol features a humid continental climate that closely borders an oceanic climate and has transitional features of the humid subtropical climate due to its warm summers. Precipitation is relatively evenly spread throughout the year, though there is a noticeable increase in monthly precipitation in June and July.

Demographics

Population 
The population of the city was about 190,000 in 1989 and about 203,000 in 1992. 41% were Russians, 32% Ukrainians (both Eastern Slavic) and 18% were Moldovans (Romanians).

As result of the political and economic situation that followed the proclamation of the independent (unrecognized) Transnistria, as well as large Jewish emigration in the early 1990s, the population of the city fell below its 1989 number and the 2004 Transnistrian census put its population at 158,069.

In 1926, 29,700 people lived in the city of Tiraspol who were classified, by ethnicity, as follows:

According to the Soviet census of 1939, the city's population was 43,676 inhabitants, distributed as follows:

2004

According to the unofficial census, 90.4% of the city's residents hold Transnistrian "citizenship", but some of them also have a second citizenship: the Republic of Moldova - 16.2%, the Russian Federation - 16.1%.

Religion 
The Latin Catholic minority was served by its own Roman Catholic Diocese of Tiraspol (originally called Cherson), which at times also covered part of neighbouring Romania and Russia, until its 2002 suppression and merger into the Russian Diocese of Saint Clement at Saratov.

Culture 

The statue of Alexander Suvorov was erected in the central square in 1979 in commemoration of his 250th anniversary. In front of the Transnistrian Government building there is a statue of Vladimir Lenin. On the opposite side of the central square, a monument plaza features a Soviet T-34 tank, commemorating the Soviet victory in World War II, an eternal flame to those who fell defending the city in 1941 and liberating it in 1944, as well as several monuments dedicated to more recent conflicts, including the Soviet–Afghan War and the War of Transnistria.

Sport
The two main football clubs are Sheriff Tiraspol and FC Tiraspol. Sheriff is the most successful Moldovan football club of recent history, winning 14 league titles since the 2000–2001 season, and 6 Moldovan Cups. Noted for their last-minute 2–1 Champions League victory against Real Madrid on 28 September 2021. A third club, CS Tiligul-Tiras Tiraspol, withdrew from competition prior to the 2009–2010 season. Tiraspol is home to the Sheriff Stadium, the largest capacity stadium in the region, with a capacity of 14,300 seats.

International relations

Twin towns – sister cities 

 Bălți, Moldova
 Comrat, Moldova
 Trondheim, Norway (2000)
 Volgograd, Russia
 Kaluga, Russia
 Kursk, Russia
 Obninsk, Russia
 Severodvinsk, Russia
 Novosibirsk , Russia
 Mykolaiv, Ukraine
 Kherson, Ukraine
 Cherkasy, Ukraine
 Ternopil, Ukraine
 Ashdod, Israel
 Leninsky District, Minsk, Belarus
 Sukhumi, Abkhazia, Georgia
 Tskhinvali, South Ossetia, Georgia
 Santarem, Portugal

Notable people 

 Nikolay Zelinsky (1861 in Tiraspol – 1953 in Moscow) Russian and Soviet chemist, academician of the Academy of Sciences, invented the first filtering activated charcoal gas mask
 Georgi Stamatov (1869 in Tiraspol – 1942 in Sofia) a Bulgarian writer.
 Mikhail Larionov (1881 in Tiraspol – 1964) an avant-garde Russian painter.
 Abraham Rabinovitch (1889 in Tiraspol – 1964 in New South Wales) an Australian-Russian property developer and pioneer of the Sydney Modern Orthodox Jewish community; emigrated to Australia in 1915
 Gheorghe Pintilie (born 1902 in Tiraspol – 1985) Soviet intelligence agent, Russian citizen and naturalised Romanian communist activist of Ukrainian origin, the first Director of the Securitate
 Izrail Shmurun (1912 in Tiraspol – 1985 in Chișinău) a Moldavian Soviet architect
 Larisa Eryomina (born 1950 in Tiraspol) stage and screen actress in Soviet films of the 1970s.
 Oxana Ionova (born 1966 in Tiraspol) head of the state tax service of Transnistria, director of Transnistria's central bank from 2008 to 2011; subsequently charged with embezzlement of Russian humanitarian aid, illegal business practices, abuse of power and forgery.
 Vlad Stashevsky (born 1974 in Tiraspol) a Russian pop singer.
 Berenika Glixman (born 1984 in Tiraspol) Israeli classical pianist
 Sergey Stepanov (born 1984 in Tiraspol) musician and composer from Transnistria, member of the SunStroke Project
 Valeria Lukyanova (born 1985 in Tiraspol) a Ukrainian model and entertainer, famous for her resemblance to a Barbie doll, lives in Moscow.

Politics 
 Serhiy Kivalov (born 1954 in Tiraspol) Ukrainian politician, jurist, parliamentarian, head of Central Election Commission
 Vladimir Mikhailovich Belyaev (born 18 March 1965 in Tiraspol) the minister of information and telecommunications
 Maya Parnas (born 1974 in Tiraspol) politician and was the former acting Prime Minister of Transnistria
 Nina Shtanski (born 1977 in Tiraspol) former Transnistrian state politician, the Minister of Foreign Affairs 2012 to 2015
 Roman Khudyakov (born 1977 in Tiraspol) a Transnistrian-born Russian politician, chairman of the Liberal Democratic Party of Pridnestrovie
 Vladimir Yastrebchak (born 1979 in Tiraspol) the Minister of Foreign Affairs of Transnistria from 2008 to 2012.
 Olga Paterova (born in 1984 in Tiraspol) a politician, the press secretary for the political youth organization Breakthrough
 Yury Cheban, Transnistrian Minister of Natural Resources and Ecological Control

Sport 
 Constantin Nour (1906 or 1907 in Tiraspol – 1986) a Romanian champion middleweight boxer and national team trainer
 Larisa Popova (born 1957 in Tiraspol) Moldovan rower who competed for the Soviet Union in the 1976 Summer Olympics
 Igor Samoilenco (born 1977 in Tiraspol) retired male boxer from Moldova
 Andrei Mihailov (born 1980 in Tiraspol) former backstroke swimmer, competed in the 2000 and the 2004 Summer Olympics
 Andrei Corneencov (born 1982 in Tiraspol) former Moldovan international footballer.
 Stanislau Tsivonchyk (born 1985 in Tiraspol) a Belarusian pole vaulter, competed in the pole vault at the 2012 Summer Olympics
 Vitalie Bulat (born 1987 in Tiraspol) Moldovan footballer
 Oleksandr Kolchenko (born 1988 in Tiraspol) a Ukrainian basketball player for Cherkaski Mavpy and the Ukraine national team
 Dănilă Artiomov (born 1994 in Tiraspol) a Moldovan breaststroke swimmer
 Artur Dalaloyan (born 1996 in Tiraspol) a Russian artistic gymnast of Armenian origin

Gallery

References 
Notes

Further reading 
 Tiraspol (p. 422) at Miriam Weiner's Routes to Roots Foundation

External links

Non-Transnistrian links 
 
  Tyraspol (Tiraspol) in the Geographical Dictionary of the Kingdom of Poland (1892)

Transnistrian links 
 Tiraspol.info 

 
Cities and towns in Transnistria
Cities and towns in Moldova
Municipalities of Moldova
Populated places on the Dniester
Populated places established in 1792
1792 establishments in Europe
Tiraspolsky Uyezd
Holocaust locations in Moldova

Subnotes